Felton "Corky" McCorquodale (August 23, 1904 – November 23, 1968) was a professional poker player, noted as the person who introduced Texas hold 'em to Las Vegas in 1963.

Poker had been legal in Las Vegas since 1931, but Texas hold 'em was not played. In 1963, McCorquodale introduced Texas hold'em at the California Club in Las Vegas. The game became popular and quickly spread to the Golden Nugget, Stardust and Dunes.

He was a respected no-limit player in his career. Since McCorquodale's death in 1968, Texas hold ‘em has now become one of the most popular forms of the game in the world.

He was a posthumous charter inductee into the Poker Hall of Fame in 1979.

References

1904 births
1968 deaths
American poker players
Poker Hall of Fame inductees
American gamblers